The Lucky Star is a 1980 Canadian drama film.

Plot
A young Jewish boy who escapes from the traumas of the war-torn Netherlands by living in a fantasy world of American westerns.

Cast
Brett Marx as David Goldberg
Rod Steiger as Colonel Gluck
Louise Fletcher as Loes Bakker
Lou Jacobi as Elia Goldberg
 Yvon Dufour  as Burgomeister
Helen Hughes as Rose Goldberg
Isabelle Mejias as Marijke
Jean Gascon as The Priest
 Kalman Steinberg  as Salomon
 Pierre Gobeil  as Peter

Recognition
 Genie Award for Best Achievement in Sound Editing - Jean-Guy Montpetit - Won
 Genie Award for Best Music Score - Art Phillips - Won
 Genie Award for Best Screenplay Adapted from Another Medium - Max Fischer - Won
 Genie Award for Best Achievement in Overall Sound - Michel Descombes, Patrick Rousseau - Nominated
 Genie Award for Best Motion Picture - André Fleury, Claude Léger - Nominated
 Genie Award for Best Performance by a Foreign Actor - Brett Marx - Nominated
 Genie Award for Best Performance by a Foreign Actor - Rod Steiger - Nominated
 Genie Award for Best Performance by a Foreign Actress - Louise Fletcher - Nominated

References

External links
 
 

1980 films
1980 drama films
Canadian drama films
English-language Canadian films
Films about Jews and Judaism
Films shot in Montreal
1980s English-language films
1980s Canadian films